Sean Hickey is an American composer and record label executive, born in 1970 in Detroit, Michigan, and currently based in New York. In 2022, he was appointed Managing Director of Pentatone.

Career
As a teenager he took lessons in electric guitar. At Wayne State University, Hickey's composition teachers included James Hartway and James Lentini. He has been commissioned by a number of musicians and organizations including for Lincoln Center for the Performing Arts, the Saint Petersburg Symphony, Michala Petri, Avi Avital, the Fine Arts Quartet, and the Whatcom Symphony Orchestra.

His first commercial recording, Left at the Fork in the Road, was released in November 2005 on Naxos American Classics. Featuring a selection of his chamber and orchestral works, the album broke the Billboard Top 100 Classical Chart and was praised as "substantive and savvy" by the magazine Gramophone.

In May 2013, an album of Hickey's clarinet and cello concertos was released on Delos. The album features cellist Dmitry Kouzov and clarinetist Alexander Fiterstein, along with the Saint Petersburg State Symphony Orchestra conducted by Vladimir Lande. The record was subsequently reviewed by NewMusicBox, which called the clarinet concerto "a formidable work".

Hickey's album Cursive was released in May 2014 on Delos, and is a retrospective of much of the composer's work for piano and chamber music combinations. Performing on the album are pianist Philip Edward Fisher, violinist Julia Sakharova, flutist Brandon Patrick George, violist Anne Lanzilotti, and harpist Meredith Clark. A further recording, by Greek guitarist Smaro Gregoriadou, was released on Delos in 2016, and features the second recording of his "Tango Grotesco", for solo guitar.

2017 saw the release of A Pacifying Weapon, a concerto for recorder and orchestra commissioned by recorder virtuoso Michala Petri, and premiered by the Royal Danish Conservatory Orchestra led by Jean Thorel. The premiere and recording took place in September 2016 in Copenhagen, released in 2017 on Our Recordings, and again in 2019, also on Our, as "American Recorder Concertos". He has seen three other recordings of his works in 2019.

Hickey is also a published poet and writer of music reviews and travelogues. He is an ASCAP member and is published by Cantabile Press. In addition, he was the Senior Vice-president, Sales and Business development, for Naxos of America, and speaks regularly at colleges, conservatories and universities throughout the world on his compositional and creative work, as well new media and musician entrepreneurship. In April 2022 Pentatone appointed Hickey as managing director.

Works

Chamber
Ampersand (2006) violin, piano
Avatar (2005) violin, clarinet, piano
Barri Gotic (2013) flute, guitar
Concerto for Clarinet and String Quartet (2006) B-flat clarint, 2 violins, viola, cello
Flute Sonata (1994) flute, piano
Fool's Errand (2004) B-flat clarinet, piano
Foolscap (2011) cello, piano
Funny Papers (2003) accordion, piano
Granfalloon (2004) bassoon, piano
Grecian Bend (2014) 2 vlns, vla, vcl
Horse's Mouth (2006) B-flat trumpet, horn, trombone
Le Visage de Vence (2011) flute, piano
Left at the Fork in the Road (2003) flute, B-flat clarinet, bassoon
Longitude (2013) viola, piano
Lunula (2016) flute, English horn
Mala Strana (2017) violin, horn in F
Mandolin Canons (2005) mandolin, guitar
Mock Tudor (2016) recorder, guitar
Pair of Pants (2003) flute, B-flat clarinet
Paradise Out of Focus (1992) flute, oboe, B-flat clarinet, horn, bassoon
Pied a Terre (2007) flute, viola, harp
Portage of Paz (1997) viola, guitar
Rumble Strip (2004) randomized ensemble
Runes and Alphabets (1998) flute, B-flat trumpet, harp, marimba, xylophone, percussion
Second String Quartet – Common Knowledge (2018) 2 violins, viola, cello
Second String Trio (1996) violin, viola, cello
Sonata for Viola and Piano – Jefferson Chalmers (2016) viola, piano
String Quartet (1996) 2 violins, viola, cello
String Trio (1994) violin, viola, cello
Terroir (2014) 2 violins, viola, cello and piano
Third String Quartet
Tiergarten (2019) B-flat clarinet, violin, piano
Unintended Consequences (2010) flute, violin, cello, piano
Viola Sonata "Jefferson Chalmers" (2017) viola, piano
Yurodivi (2012) B-flat clarinet, piano

Choral
A Mind of Winter (2003) SATB chorus
Agnus Dei (2007) flute, 2 ob, 2 bsns, 2 tpts, 2 trb, SATB chorus, cello, bass
Magnificat (1993) SATB chorus, organ
One Song, America, Before I Go (2017) SATB a cappella chorus

Orchestral
A Pacifying Weapon – Concerto for Recorder and Orchestra (2016)
Atahualpa (2015)
Concerto for Cello and Orchestra (2008) solo cello, orchestra
Concerto for Clarinet and Orchestra (2006) clarinet, string orchestra (string quintet in chamber version)
Dalliance (2003) 2fl, 2 ob, 2 Bb cl, 2 bsn, 3 hn, 2 Bb tr, 2 trb, tuba, timp.,triangle, b.d, cymbals, tamb, harp, str.
Hitherto (2015) full orchestra
Mandolin Concerto (2010) solo mandolin, 10 winds, percussion, double bass
Sagesse (2003) fl, ob, 2 Bb cl, bsn, 2 hn, perc Str, ms, tenor
Sinfonietta (2010) flute, oboe, B-flat clarinet, bassoon, horn, 2 violins, viola, cello, bass
Single Malt (2015) vlns I, vlns II, vlas, vcls, db.
Symphony ("Olympus Mons") (2012) large orchestra
Symphony for Strings (1995) string orchestra

Solo
Archipelago (2002) piano
B-flat (2011) B-flat clarinet
Beara (2001) violoncello
Cursive (2011) piano
Dance Apotheosis (2017) violin
Dolmen (1999) piano
Fallows (2012) piano
Feeling Gravity's Pull (2010) oboe
Fluff (2004) flute
Hill Music: A Breton Ramble (2002) piano
I'm About to do to You (What's Been Done to Me) (2013) Piano
In Memoriam Kurt Vonnegut (2007) piano
Insufficient Means (2019) oboe
Ipso Facto (2019) piano
Let the Sea Make a Noise (2018) cello, or any solo instrument
Night Café (1993) piano
Ostinato Grosso (2002) piano
Portage II (2000) B-flat clarinet
Portage III – Sarabande for Piano (2000) piano
Portage IV (2000) clarinet in A
Reckoning (2011) piano
Saying Makes It So (2016) piano
Scree (2000) piano
Song (1992) piano
Suite After Milhaud (1994) piano
Tango Grotesco (2001) guitar
The Birds of Barclay Street (2001) piano
Two Epigrams (1995) bassoon
Under the Trees The River Laughing (1991) piano
What the Fisherwoman Saw (2004) piano

Voice
Nocturne (2001) mezzo-soprano, piano
To the Wars (2004) soprano, clarinet, cello

References

External links

1970 births
Living people
American composers
American male composers
21st-century American composers
21st-century American male musicians
Musicians from Detroit
Wayne State University alumni